Gomila pri Kogu is a settlement in the hills northeast of Ormož in northeastern Slovenia, right on the border with Croatia. The area belongs to the traditional region of Styria and is now included in the Drava Statistical Region.

Name
The name of the settlement was changed from Gomila to Gomila pri Kogu in 1955.

References

External links
Gomila pri Kogu on Geopedia

Populated places in the Municipality of Ormož